Det sovande folket ("The Sleeping People") is a book written in 1993 by Fredrik Reinfeldt, later Prime Minister of Sweden, and published by the Moderate Youth League. 
Written when the early 1990s banking crisis was deepest, the book argues for abandoning the general welfare state in Sweden, for sharp tax cuts, and for the rollback of the state's involvement in education, law, culture, and the media: "The Swedes are mentally handicapped and indoctrinated to believe that politicians can create and guarantee welfare."Reinfeldt, F.: Det sovande folket, Moderata ungdomsförbundet (p. 52)

"We don't want to see a society where people starve, but other than that no standard rights should be financed by taxes." In the first chapter the author presents a dystopian vision of the future.  Later chapters detail the Moderates' plan of action, its implementation in daily life, and its moral basis. The last chapter presents examples from real life.

After Reinfeldt became the leader of the Moderate Party in 2003, and Prime Minister in 2006, the book was often referred to by his political opponents.

At the 2009 Social Democratic Party congress, the party leader Mona Sahlin recommended reading the book, not for inspiration, but to understand the bourgeois ideology.

In 2013 a theater group adapted Det sovande folket to the stage, which renewed discussion of the book.

Criticism 
In 2014, Folkbladet published an article criticizing Reinfeldt for having denied authorship of the book. The book has been criticized for falsifying Swedish history. The extreme right-wing Nordfront criticized Reinfeldt for his "svenskfientlighet" (swede-phobia) in the book.

See also

From Social State to Minimal State by Anders Fogh Rasmussen
Night-watchman state

References

External links
Det sovande folket (PDF) via Alliansfritt Sverige

Moderate Party
Swedish-language literature
Political literature
1993 non-fiction books